Jo Mi-ryeong (born February 4, 1929) is a South Korean actress. Jo was born in South Gyeongsang province in 1929.

Filmography
*Note; the whole list is referenced.

Awards
1966, the 4th Blue Dragon Film Awards, Best Supporting Actress for Na Un-gyu ui insaeng (나운규 일생)

References

External links

1929 births
South Korean actresses
Living people
People from Changwon